Something for Thee Hotties (co-titled From Thee Archives) is a compilation album by American rapper Megan Thee Stallion. It was released on October 29, 2021, by 300 Entertainment and 1501 Certified as a "thank you" gift to Megan's fanbase. The compilation serves as a collection of some of her previously-released YouTube freestyles, as well as previously unreleased archival songs; with the only guest appearances Juicy J, VickeeLo and Dino BTW contributing skits. It also includes "Thot Shit", which was released as a single in June that year. The compilation was produced primarily by LilJuMadeDaBeat, with external contributions from a variety of producers including Juicy J, Murda Beatz, and J.R. Rotem, among others.

The compilation debuted at number five on the US Billboard 200, becoming Megan Thee Stallion's fourth top-10 album.

Background
On October 21, 2021, Megan Thee Stallion announced the compilation as her gift to her fanbase she calls "Hotties", saying that the project would feature some of the YouTube freestyles her fans were asking for, as well as unreleased songs from her archives. The original tracklist was then revealed on October 27, initially featuring fifteen tracks including the previously-released single "Thot Shit". The tracklist was then updated under an hour prior to the compilation's intended midnight release, featuring 5 more tracks including "Warning", "Kitty Kat" and skits performed by Juicy J, VickeeLo and Dino BTW. The compilation was delayed by a few hours, eventually being released at 8am on the scheduled date.

In a Twitter Q&A shortly after the compilation's release, Megan revealed that majority of the songs on the compilation were recorded throughout 2021. Some of the most recent songs were recorded a few weeks prior to the compilation's release; and the oldest songs recorded were the Tidal Bless the Booth freestyle from 2019, as well as "Bae Goals".

Lawsuit 
1501 Certified did not recognize it as an album., claiming the project's 44:38 of material is less than the 45 minutes stipulated in the singer's recording contract, including 29 minutes of new material. Along with the disallowance of the project, the rapper would have to release two more albums in addition to Something. On February 18, 2022, the rapper took legal action against the label claiming that Something meets the definition of an album.

Track listing

Charts

References

2021 compilation albums
Albums produced by Juicy J
Albums produced by Murda Beatz
Albums produced by J. R. Rotem
Megan Thee Stallion albums